Nosferatu is an album by John Zorn released on the Tzadik label in April 2012 on the 100th Anniversary of Bram Stoker's death. Zorn wrote the score as a commission for a Polish theatre group's adaption of Stoker's novel Dracula.

Reception

Allmusic said  "With the ever-changing nature of its music and the relatively short cues, Nosferatu feels much shorter than it is; it's a deeply focused work that holds together easily. While its very subject matter dictates sinister overtones, the music found here, with few exceptions, is quite pleasurable and accessible listening; when taken together, its cues suggest a new kind of American Gothic". All About Jazz stated "Zorn's Nosferatu is a generally haunting album, but the composer punctuates the doom and gloom with moments of grandeur, aggression and even outright jazziness... Nosferatu doesn't present any surprises or musical innovation. Nevertheless, the ambient album flows well, and is a solid addition to Zorn's catalog of musical scores with a couple examples of great sax playing".

Track listing
All compositions by John Zorn

Personnel
 John Zorn − piano, alto saxophone, Fender Rhodes, electronics, breath
 Rob Burger − piano, organ
 Bill Laswell − bass
 Kevin Norton − vibraphone, drums, orchestral bells, Tibetan prayer bowls

References

2012 albums
Tzadik Records albums
John Zorn albums
Albums produced by John Zorn